Vormsi Airfield (ICAO: EEVO) is an airfield in Vormsi, Lääne County, Estonia.

The airfield's owner is the aviation club Aero Vormsi Klubi.

References

Airports in Estonia
Buildings and structures in Lääne County
Vormsi Parish